La Fregate is a hotel in Saint Peter Port, Guernsey, overlooking Cambridge Park, near Saint Peter Port Harbour. The hotel, located in a historic 18th century manor house, contains 9 double rooms and 4 single rooms. The AA two rosette restaurant as of 2011 is headed by Neil Maginnis, and is noted for its seafood. 
The Telegraph notes that the hotel's Orangery is a rendezvous point for businessmen. La Fregate has a 4 Star AA hotel rating as of 2019.

Reception
Rupert Parker, writing for the Huffington Post in 2015 wrote: "Starter is sashimi of salmon, sea bass and scallops and then I get fillet of Brill, a member of the Turbot family, on a bed of spinach, piled high with crab meat. All is excellent, and they’ll be hosting the Seriously Seafood Supper on 18th September."

Conviction
In 2011, Chris Sharp, the former director of the hotel, was convicted at  Guernsey's Royal Court and jailed for four years for seven counts of child pornography offences.

References

External links
Official website

Hotels in Guernsey
Country houses in the Channel Islands
Buildings and structures in Saint Peter Port
18th-century architecture